Ostap Volodymyrovych Savka (4 April 1947 – 10 August 2022) was a Ukrainian professional footballer who played as midfielder.

Career
Born in Drohobych, Savka began his football career in Naftovyk in his native city. In the 1968–69 season, he played 26 matches for FC Shakhtar Donetsk and transferred from there to Karpaty Lviv, later becoming a captain of this club (in nine seasons in the team, he played 194 matches and scored 16 goals, played in the debut European Cup campaign of Karpaty in 1970).

After the end of his career, Savka, whose last clubs were Kolos Nikopol and Krystal Kherson, worked as a children football trainer in the Youth Sportive School #4 in Lviv. Among his pupils were Ukrainian football players Oleh Tymchyshyn and Andriy Klymenko.

Savka died in Lviv on 10 August 2022, at the age of 75.

References

Further reading

External links
 

1947 births
2022 deaths
People from Drohobych
Soviet footballers
Ukrainian footballers
Association football midfielders
Soviet Top League players
Soviet First League players
Soviet Second League players
FC Halychyna Drohobych players
FC Shakhtar Donetsk players
FC Karpaty Lviv players
FC Sokil Lviv players
FC Elektrometalurh-NZF Nikopol players
FC Krystal Kherson players